Albigna Lake (German: Albignasee, Italian: Lago da l'Albigna, Romansh: Lägh da l'Albigna) is a reservoir in the canton of Graubünden, Switzerland. Its outflow, the Albigna River, is a left tributary of the Mera River.

See also
List of lakes of Switzerland
List of mountain lakes of Switzerland

External links

Albigna
Lakes of Graubünden
Val Bregaglia